Hanan Mohamed Al Kuwari  is a Qatari healthcare management professional. In 2015 she appeared at #20 in the CEO Middle East list of the 100 most powerful Arab women. She was appointed as Qatar Minister of Public Health in January 2016 and serves on multiple medical boards in Qatar and the United States.

Education 
She studied at Brunel University in the United Kingdom, earning her PhD in healthcare management in 2002.

Early career 
Al Kuwari has worked for the WHO, Reuters and as a freelance health reporter.
She entered the field of healthcare management in 1996 by joining the Women's Hospital of Hamad Medical Corporation (HMC).  

Since 2007, she has maintained her position as a Managing Director of HMC.

Current positions 
Al Kuwari currently holds the following positions:

 Chairperson of the Academic Health System International Advisory Board
 Chairperson of the Hamad Healthcare Quality Institute International Advisory Board
Co-chairperson of the Joint Advisory Board of Weill Cornell Medicine - Qatar
Member of the Board of Regents
Governor on the Board of Governors for Sidra Medicine
Vice Chair for the Board of the Qatar Precision Medicine Institute
Member of Board of Directors of Qatar Foundation for Social Work
Member of Qatar Foundation’s Qatar Research, Development and Innovation Council 

As the Minister of Qatar's Public health, Al Kuwari is responsible for the functions of the Ministry of Health. This includes overseeing all programs in the public and private sectors. She works to ensure the efficiency of the service providers and public health service programs, and the growth of Qatar's National Health and Public Health Strategies. Recently, the Joint Committee Meeting on 'Health in All Policies' was participated in by eleven ministries and government entities. Al Kuwari presided over the meeting, which was held at the Ministry of Public Health headquarters. During this meeting, she encouraged joint participation in order to further the objectives laid out by Qatar's Second National Development Strategy 2018-2022. 

In October 2018 she was elected as an international member of the National Academy of Medicine (NAM) of the United States.

References

External links 

 HMC celebrates 40 years of sustaining health of Qatar’s population
 Working as one | Health & Education | Interview
 Weill Cornell Medicine - Qatar - H.E. Dr. Hanan Mohamed Al Kuwari
 Gulf Times - Project to adopt 'healthy city' in Qatar by 2022 discussed
 Qatar Second National  Development Strategy  2018~2022 (pdf)
 Minister of Public Health - Her Excellency Dr. Hanan Mohamed Al Kuwari, Minister of Public Health, Officially Inducted into the National Academy of Medicine

Year of birth missing (living people)
Living people
Women government ministers of Qatar
Government ministers of Qatar
Alumni of Brunel University London
Members of the National Academy of Medicine